Wayne William Umbreit (May 1, 1913, Markesan, Wisconsin – August 4, 2007, Holland, Pennsylvania) was an American bacteriologist.

Biography
At the University of Wisconsin–Madison (UWM), Umbreit graduated with a B.Sc. in 1934 and an M.Sc. in 1936. At UWM he worked as an assistant in bacteriology and biochemistry and a research associate from 1936 to 1937. At Rutgers University he was an instructor in soil microbiology from 1937 to 1938. In 1938 he returned to UWM, graduating with a Ph.D. in 1939. His Ph.D. thesis Studies on the mechanism of symbiotic nitrogen fixation was supervised by Perry William Wilson. At UWM Umbreit taught bacteriology and biochemistry, as an instructor from 1938 to 1941 and as an assistant professor from 1941 to 1944. In the department of bacteriology of Cornell University, he was an associate professor from 1944 to 1946 and a full professor from 1946 to 1947, when he resigned. From 1947 to 1958, Umbreit was the head of the department of enzyme chemistry of the Merck Institute for Therapeutic Research in Rahway, New Jersey. At Rutgers University he was a professor of microbiology from 1958 to 1983, when he retired as professor emeritus. He did research on the biochemistry of several topics: nitrogen fixation, vitamins, antibiotics, and autotrophic bacteria.

Umbreit received in 1947 the Eli Lilly and Company-Elanco Research Award. He was elected in 1951 a fellow of the American Association for the Advancement of Science.  In 1952 he was awarded the Biochemical Congress Symposium Medal of the 2nd International Biochemical Congress, which was held in Paris in July 1952.

In 1937 he married Doris McQuade (1914–2001). They had a daughter and two sons.

Selected publications

Articles

Books
  (The book's title was changed several times for subsequent editions.)
 
 ;

References

External links
 
 

1913 births
2007 deaths
American bacteriologists
American biochemists
American soil scientists
University of Wisconsin–Madison alumni
University of Wisconsin–Madison faculty
Merck & Co. people
Rutgers University faculty
Fellows of the American Association for the Advancement of Science
People from Markesan, Wisconsin
Cornell University faculty